István Ládai (Láday; 14 May 1873 – 15 April 1936) was a Hungarian politician and jurist, who served as People's Commissar of Justice in 1919 during the Hungarian Soviet Republic.

External links 
 Magyar Életrajzi Lexikon

1873 births
Year of death unknown
People from Kecskemét
Hungarian communists
Justice ministers of Hungary
Hungarian emigrants to Romania